The Crystal Ball is a painting by John William Waterhouse completed in 1902.  Waterhouse displayed both it and The Missal in the Royal Academy of 1902.  The painting shows the influence of the Italian Renaissance with vertical and horizontal lines, along with circles "rather than the pointed arches of the Gothic".

Part of a private collection, the painting has been restored to show the skull which had been covered by a previous owner.

References

1902 paintings
Paintings by John William Waterhouse
Books in art
Skulls in art
Witches in art